William Brodrick may refer to:

 William Brodrick (1763–1819), British politician
 William John Brodrick, 7th Viscount Midleton (1798–1870), Irish peer and Anglican clergyman
 William Brodrick, 8th Viscount Midleton (1830–1907), Irish peer, landowner and politician
 St John Brodrick, 1st Earl of Midleton (1856–1942), British politician
 William Brodrick (writer) (born 1960), British novelist

See also 
 William Broderick (1877–1957), Irish politician and farmer